Lucien Faber (born 29 March 1952) is a Luxembourgian racewalker. He competed in the men's 20 kilometres walk at the 1976 Summer Olympics and the 1980 Summer Olympics.

References

1952 births
Living people
Athletes (track and field) at the 1976 Summer Olympics
Athletes (track and field) at the 1980 Summer Olympics
Luxembourgian male racewalkers
Olympic athletes of Luxembourg
Place of birth missing (living people)